The 2017 Kontinental Hockey League All-Star Game took place on January 22, 2017 at Ufa Arena in Ufa, Russia, home of Salavat Yulaev Ufa, during the 2016–17 KHL season.

The 2017 All-Star Game saw a change in format from previous years, as instead of being a single game between West and East, it became a tournament between the four divisions of the KHL: the Bobrov, Tarasov, Kharlamov, and Chernyshev.

Rosters

References

2017
2016–17 KHL season
Sport in Ufa
January 2017 sports events in Russia